Gaius Julius Aquila was the name of a number of people who lived during the Roman Empire.

Prefect of Egypt
Gaius Julius Aquila was a praefectus of Roman Egypt between 10 CE and 11.

Governor of Bythinia et Pontus
Gaius Julius Aquila was a Roman knight, stationed with a few cohorts, in 45 CE, to protect Tiberius Julius Cotys I, king of the Bosporan Kingdom, who had received the sovereignty after the expulsion of Tiberius Julius Mithridates. In the same year, Aquila obtained the praetorian insignia. He also erected a monument honouring the emperor Claudius in Asia Minor (modern Turkey) known as the Kuşkayası Monument.

References

1st-century Romans
1st-century Roman governors of Egypt
Aquila
Ancient Roman prosopographical lists